John M. Rhodes is a General in the United States National Guard.

References

National Guard (United States) generals
Living people
Year of birth missing (living people)
Place of birth missing (living people)
American military personnel of the Gulf War
American military personnel of the Iraq War
Mississippi State University alumni